Michael Francis Lloyd (born 1 November 1957)  is a British Church of England priest and academic. He has been Principal of Wycliffe Hall, University of Oxford, since his appointment in 2013.

Early life and education
Lloyd was born on 1 November 1957. He studied at Downing College, Cambridge, graduating with a Bachelor of Arts (BA) degree in 1979: as per tradition, his BA was promoted to a Master of Arts (MA Cantab). From 1981 to 1984, he trained for ordination at Cranmer Hall, Durham, an open evangelical theological college. He also studied theology at Durham University as a member of St John's College, and graduated in 1983 with first-class honours BA. He later undertook postgraduate research at Worcester College, Oxford, completing his Doctor of Philosophy (DPhil) degree in 1997. His doctoral thesis was titled "The cosmic fall and the free will defence".

Ordained ministry
Lloyd was ordained in the Church of England as a deacon in 1984 and as a priest in 1985. From 1984 to 1987, he served his curacy at St John the Baptist, Locks Heath in the Diocese of Portsmouth.

He was formerly the chaplain at The Queen's College, Oxford and was the Director of Studies in Theology at Christ's College, Cambridge. Lloyd has taught theology and doctrine at the University of Oxford, Cambridge University and St Paul's Theological Centre, London. He has published the popular introduction Café Theology and has a particular interest in the doctrine of evil and the problem of pain.

References

External links
 Biography at Wycliffe Hall

21st-century English Anglican priests
Living people
Principals of Wycliffe Hall, Oxford
1957 births
Alumni of St John's College, Durham
Alumni of Downing College, Cambridge
Alumni of Cranmer Hall, Durham